MyZeil is a shopping mall in the center of Frankfurt, Germany. It was designed by Italian architect Massimiliano Fuksas. It is part of the PalaisQuartier development, with its main entrance on the Zeil, Frankfurt's main shopping street. It was officially opened on 26 February 2009 by the city mayor Petra Roth. 

 

Shopping malls in Germany
Buildings and structures in Frankfurt
Tourist attractions in Frankfurt